Presidential elections were held in Togo on 21 June 1998. Incumbent President Gnassingbé Eyadéma, in power since 1967, was re-elected with 52.1% of the vote according to official results. The opposition disputed this and claimed that Gilchrist Olympio of the Union of the Forces of Change (UFC) had won.

Campaign
Léopold Gnininvi of the Democratic Convention of African Peoples (CPDA) was the first declared candidate in the election, followed by Eyadéma, the candidate of the Rally of the Togolese People (RPT), and Yawovi Agboyibo of the Action Committee for Renewal (CAR).

Results
The Constitutional Court declared the final results on 10 July 1998. Eyadéma was sworn in on 24 July at a ceremony in the National Assembly, which was boycotted by the opposition.

References

Presidential elections in Togo
Togo
1998 in Togo
Togo